is a 2016 Japanese drama film directed by Ryōta Nakano. It was selected as the Japanese entry for the Best Foreign Language Film at the 90th Academy Awards, but it was not nominated.

Plot
Futaba (Rie Miyazawa) single-handedly raising her teenage daughter Azumi (Hana Sugisaki) is diagnosed with terminal cancer and learns she only has a few months to live.  She decides to use her last few months to improve the life of her family. To do this, she tracks down her husband, Kazuhiro (Joe Odagiri), who had left her for another woman.  The other woman had in turn abandoned him, leaving him to look after a 9-year old daughter Ayuko (Aoi Itō) whom she claimed was the result of a one-night stand years before. Together, Futaba, Kazuhiro and the two girls reopen the family bathhouse, which will provide them with a comfortable life. Other challenges facing Futaba include helping Azumi to fend for herself at school and taking the girls on a road trip to introduce Azumi to her biological mother, Kimie (Yukiko Shinohara), a deaf woman who gave birth to Azumi when she was only 19.

Cast
Rie Miyazawa as Futaba Sachino
Hana Sugisaki as Azumi Sachino
Joe Odagiri as Kazuhiro Sachino
Tori Matsuzaka as Takumi Mukai
Aoi Itō as Ayuko Katase 
Yukiko Shinohara as Kimie Sakamaki 
Tarō Suruga as Takimoto

Awards

See also
 List of submissions to the 90th Academy Awards for Best Foreign Language Film
 List of Japanese submissions for the Academy Award for Best Foreign Language Film

References

External links
 

2016 films
Films about cancer
2010s Japanese films
2010s Japanese-language films